RICM may refer to:
 Reflection Interference Contrast Microscopy, a type of optical microscopy
 Régiment d'infanterie-chars de marine, a regiment of the French army